The 1968 Honduran Cup was the first football cup played in Honduras, the tournament was won by Motagua and it was divided into two groups of five, advancing the top two to the final round. The celebration and international recognition of the country's inaugural cup was overshadowed by the national teams loss eight months later in World Cup qualifications against El Salvador, which was played several weeks before both countries waged a four-day war.

First round

Group A

Group B

Final Round
Oddly, instead of inter-crossing the winners and runner-ups of each group, the semifinals were played within the group contenders.  In case of a leveled score after 90 minutes, the match was decided by a penalty shoot-out of three (3) shots pear team, taken by a single player.

Semifinals

Third place

Final

References

1968
Cup